Tocororo is a jazz album by Alfredo Rodríguez, the third under his leadership. Named after a Cuban bird that dies of sadness in captivity, the theme of the album is mourning and celebrating lost beauty after Rodríguez' leaving Cuba and living in USA for seven years.

Track listing

Personnel
 Johann Sebastian Bach – Composer
 Florent Bobet – Engineer
 Richard Bona – Bass (Electric),  Featured Artist,  Vocals
 Joe Bozzie – Assistant Engineer
 Ariel Bringuez – Clarinet,  Flute,  Sax (Soprano),  Sax (Tenor)
 Omar Carrascosa – Assistant Engineer
 Georges Coulonges – Composer
 Ganavya Doraiswamy – Featured Artist,  Vocals
 Maria Ehrenreich – Creative Services Coordinator,  Producer
 Adam Fell – Executive Producer
 Eliseo Grenet – Composer
 Bernie Grundman – Mastering Engineer
 Helik Hadar – Engineer
 Simon Helpert – Composer
 Natalie Hernandez – Associate Producer
 Ibeyi – Featured Artist,  Vocals
 Quincy Jones – Executive Producer,  Producer
 Randall Kennedy – Creative Director
 Albert Lasry – Composer
 Ernesto Lecuona – Composer
 Brock Lefferts – Art Direction,  Design
 Antonio Lizana – Arranger,  Featured Artist,  Vocals
 Ibrahim Maalouf – Featured Artist,  Trumpet
 José Martí – Liner Notes
 Gerardo Alfonso Morejón – Composer
 Michael Olivera – Arranger,  Drums,  Percussion
 Paulo Pulido Valente – Engineer
 Astor Piazzolla – Composer
 Al Pryor – Executive Vice President
 Francisco Repilado – Composer
 Alfredo Rodríguez – Arranger,  Composer,  Melodion,  Piano,  Primary Artist,  Producer,  Synthesizer,  Vocals
 Silvio Rodríguez – Composer
 Reiner Elizarde Ruano – Bass (Acoustic)
 Ben Soussan – Composer
 Gretchen Valade – Executive Producer
 Will Wakefield – Production Manager
 Anna Webber – Photography

References

2016 albums